Bernard H. Haggin (December 29, 1900 – May 29, 1987) was an American journalist and music critic. After beginning his career in 1923 as a freelance writer, he was music critic of the Brooklyn Daily Eagle from 1934 to 1937 and of The Nation from 1936 to 1957. He later wrote for The New York Herald Tribune, The Hudson Review, Musical America, The New Republic, The Yale Review and other publications. He was known for his ability to write short, clear reviews, but his rigid views on certain artists garnered criticism. 

Haggin wrote twelve books on music and two on ballet, including the first general guide to recorded classical music.

Early life
Haggin was born in New York City on December 29, 1900, the son of Byron Haggin and his wife Dorothea. He went to school in Manhattan and, too young for conscription in World War I, completed his high school education in 1918. He went on to the City College of New York, where he graduated in 1922. The following year he published his first music review.

Career
Haggin was a freelance writer, reviewing music and dance, until 1934, when he was appointed music critic of the Brooklyn Daily Eagle, retaining the post until 1937. From 1936 to 1957 he was music critic of the weekly magazine The Nation. The American National Biography says of his work there: "Not given to self-doubt, Haggin attributed the reputation he earned in the Nation to 'a musician's ear, and an ability to assemble words in orderly, clear statements'". His ability to write short, clear reviews was an advantage at a time when the discursive columns of an earlier generation of critics such as William J. Henderson, James Huneker and Deems Taylor were less sought after by editors. Haggin said in a 1980 interview, that his "musician's ear and ability to assemble words" remained the equipment with which, "as I continued, I heard more and wrote better". In the view of The New York Times, despite Haggin's claim, his later writing was inferior to his early work.

Haggin's prose was admired and sometimes praised by many of his contemporaries, but his rigid views were less well received by his fellow critics. His obituarist in The New York Times wrote:

Later in his career, Haggin contributed a column about music on the radio for The New York Herald Tribune and wrote for The Hudson Review, Musical America, The New Republic, and The Yale Review, among other publications. He wrote twelve books on music and two on ballet. He was the author of the first general guide to recorded classical music, Music on Records (1938), later expanded as The Listener's Musical Companion (1956, 1967 and 1971). 

Haggin died in Manhattan on May 29, 1987, after a short illness, at the age of 86. He was unmarried.

Books
Books listed in chronological order.
A Book of the Symphony (New York: Oxford University Press, 1937)
Music on Records (New York: Oxford University Press, 1938); revised as: Music on Records: a New Guide to the Music, the Performances, the Recordings (New York: Alfred Knopf, 1945)
Music for the Man who Enjoys 'Hamlet''' (New York: Alfred Knopf, 1944)Conversations with Toscanini (New York: Doubleday, 1959)The Toscanini Musicians Knew (New York: Horizon Press, 1967); 2nd edition 1980 The New Listener's Companion and Record Guide (New York: Horizon Press, 1967); 2nd edition: 1968; 3rd edition: 1971 ; 4th edition: 1974 ; 5th edition 1978 )A Decade of Music (New York: Horizon Press, 1973 )Music Observed (New York: Oxford University Press, 1964); reissued as 35 Years of Music (New York: Horizon Press, 1974 )Music and Ballet, 1973-1983 (New York: Horizon Press, 1984 )Arturo Toscanini: Contemporary Recollections of the Maestro, containing reprints of two titles: Conversations with Toscanini and The Toscanini musicians knew'' (New York: Da Capo, 1989)

References

External links
 "Music: The Hamlet of B. H. Haggin" (Review of "Music for the Man Who Enjoys Hamlet") (access available with subscription)

1900 births
1987 deaths
American information and reference writers
American music critics
Opera critics
20th-century American non-fiction writers